The 1992 Ginebra San Miguel season was the 14th season of the franchise in the Philippine Basketball Association (PBA).

Draft pick

Occurrences
In the PBA-China pre-season battle of champions in January featuring the Chinese national team and the three PBA teams that won a title last year, Ginebra San Miguel decided to withdraw from the four-day invitational meet when they send home their import Roy Marble, who fails to impress the coaching staff in their pre-season exhibition game. Swift Mighty Meaty, which posted the fourth-best win–loss record last year, takes the place of Ginebra.

On February 18 in the early grudge match between the two rivals which played for the first conference championship in the past two seasons and were part of player transfers during the off-season where former Ginebra cagers are now with Shell, the Gins beat the Turbo Chargers, 125-117. The game was so intense that had new Ginebra recruit Pido Jarencio and ex-Gin Rey Cuenco being thrown out of the game after almost a fistfight when Jarencio reacted on a punch thrown by Cuenco on fellow new Ginebra cager Sonny Cabatu, who was also given a karate chop by ex-Gin Leo Isaac. Earlier in the ballgame, it was playing coach Sonny Jaworski and rookie Mulong Orillosa who were involved in an argument.

Ginebra import Jervis Cole was suspended for one game for figuring in exchange of blows with Presto guard Onchie Dela Cruz in their game on February 27. The Gins played the San Miguel Beermen in their next outing on March 3 without the suspended Cole and they lost the match.

Former Best Import winner Jamie Waller return to play for Ginebra in the Third Conference. The Gins were allowed to have an import standing 6-4 as the handicapping rule for being eliminated twice while the rest of the teams will have a 6-1 import. Eight games into the eliminations with Ginebra carrying a four-win, four-loss record when trouble started brewing regarding import Jamie Waller's actions, but rumors were quickly dispelled when Waller led Ginebra to the semifinals with back-to-back wins over Alaska and Shell. When Shell import Kelvin Upshaw was kick out and banned by the PBA for failing a drug test, Waller went on his way and left to sympathise with Upshaw. Ginebra decided to bring in a replacement import Danny Jones, going into their highly anticipated encounter with the Tony Harris-led Swift.

Notable dates
March 15: Ginebra San Miguel overpowered their arch rivals Shell Rimula-X, 122-108, to stay alive in the battle for the last three semifinal berths of the first conference and snapped out of a five-game losing slump.

October 6: Jamie Waller banged in 62 points, including six in overtime, to lead Ginebra to a 140-134 victory over Purefoods. The Gins are now tied with idle Alaska at second place with their third straight win after losing their first game while the Hotdogs dropped to two wins and two defeats.

October 25: Chito Loyzaga scored his only two points in the game with 10 seconds left to lift Ginebra to a 118-115 triumph over Alaska as the Gins moved within a win of achieving their first semifinal stint in the 1992 season.

October 27: Ginebra makes it to the semifinals of the third conference with a 112-101 victory over Shell, whose import Kelvin Upshaw was thrown out of the game halfway through the last quarter. The Gins translate Upshaw's exit into a seven-point blitz that installed them ahead at 100-94.

November 3: New import Danny Jones debut with 59 points as Ginebra nip Swift, 146-145, to secure a solid position in second place going into the semifinal round. A last-second bankshot by Tony Harris, who scored 76 points, rolled in but was seemingly tipped out of the hoop, sending the pro-Ginebra crowd in wild frenzy as the Gins handed the Mighty Meaties only their second loss in 11 games.

Roster

Transactions

Trades

Rookie free agent

Recruited imports

References

Barangay Ginebra San Miguel seasons
Ginebra